Te Kawa railway station was a station on the North Island Main Trunk in New Zealand, located at Te Kawa.

The railway crossed  (or 8,000) Te Kawa Swamp to the north of the station on a  embankment. Culverts were included to maintain the effectiveness of eel weirs in the swamp and provide for the flow of water. A post office was open by 1909 and a drainage board set up, which was extended in 1915, by which time the station was handling traffic for Waikeria Prison.

In 1908 the station was being considered as a junction for a line to Kawhia and Raglan and by 1920 as a junction on a railway from Kawhia to Rotorua.

The line to the south of Te Kawa falls on a 1 in 183 gradient. There was a private siding for grain at the station in the 1970s and 80s.

The station site was sold in 2000.

References

External links 

1934 photo (top left) in The New Zealand Railways Magazine, Vol 9, Issue 2 (1 May).
Video of steam train passing through Te Kawa in 2008

Defunct railway stations in New Zealand
Ōtorohanga District
Rail transport in Waikato
Buildings and structures in Waikato